The Copa Rio Grande do Sul de Futebol Sub-20 (or Rio Grande do Sul Under-20 Football Cup, in English) is a cup competition played by Brazilian under-20 football teams.

List of champions

Titles by team

Titles by state

References

 FGF

Youth football competitions in Brazil
2006 establishments in Brazil
Under-20 association football